Hampton University is a private, historically black, research university in Hampton, Virginia. Founded in 1868 as Hampton Agricultural and Industrial School, it was established by Black and White leaders of the American Missionary Association after the American Civil War to provide education to freedmen. The campus houses the Hampton University Museum, which is the oldest museum of the African diaspora in the United States and the oldest museum in the commonwealth of Virginia. First led by former Union General Samuel Chapman Armstrong, Hampton University's main campus is located on 314 acres in Hampton, Virginia, on the banks of the Hampton River. 

The university offers 90 programs, including 50 bachelor's degree programs, 25 master's degree programs and nine doctoral programs. The university has a satellite campus in Virginia Beach and also has online offerings. Hampton University is home to 16 research centers, including the Hampton University Proton Therapy Institute, the largest free-standing facility of its kind in the world. Hampton University is classified among "R2: Doctoral Universities – High research activity."

History
The campus was founded on the grounds of "Little Scotland", a former plantation in Elizabeth City County that is located on the Hampton River. It overlooked Hampton Roads and was not far from Fortress Monroe and the Grand Contraband Camp that gathered nearby. Formerly  enslaved men and women sought refuge with Union forces in the South during the first year of the war. Their facilities represented freedom.

In 1861 the American Missionary Association (AMA) responded to the former slaves' need for education and hired Mary Smith Peake as its first teacher at the camp. She had already secretly been teaching slaves and free blacks in the area despite the state's legal prohibition. She first taught for the AMA on September 17, 1861, and was said to gather her pupils under a large oak. In 1863 the Emancipation Proclamation was read here—the first place in the Confederate states. From then on the big tree was called the Emancipation Oak. The tree, now a symbol of both the university and of the city, survives as part of the designated National Historic Landmark District at Hampton University.

The Hampton Agricultural and Industrial School, later called the Hampton Institute, was founded in 1868 after the war by the biracial leadership of the American Missionary Association, who were chiefly Congregational and Presbyterian ministers. It was first led by former Union General Samuel Chapman Armstrong. Among the school's famous alumni is Dr. Booker T. Washington, an educator who was hired as the first principal at the Tuskegee Institute, which he developed for decades.

Civil War
During the American Civil War (1861–1865), Union-held Fortress Monroe in southeastern Virginia at the mouth of Hampton Roads became a gathering point and safe haven of sorts for fugitive slaves. The commander, General Benjamin F. Butler, determined they were "contraband of war", to protect them from being returned to slaveholders, who clamored to reclaim them. As numerous individuals sought freedom behind Union lines, the Army arranged for the construction of the Grand Contraband Camp nearby, from materials reclaimed from the ruins of Hampton, which had been burned by the retreating Confederate Army. This area was later called "Slabtown."

Hampton University traces its roots to Mary S. Peake, who began in 1861 with outdoor classes for freedmen, whom she taught under what is now the landmark Emancipation Oak in the nearby area of Elizabeth City County. In 1863 the newly issued Emancipation Proclamation was read to a gathering under the historic tree there.

After the War: teaching teachers

After the War, a normal school (teacher training school) was formalized in 1868, with former Union brevet Brigadier General Samuel C. Armstrong (1839–1893) as its first principal. The new school was established on the grounds of a former plantation named "Little Scotland", which had a view of Hampton Roads. The original school buildings fronted the Hampton River. Legally chartered in 1870 as a land grant school, it was first known as Hampton Normal and Agricultural Institute.

Typical of historically black colleges, Hampton received much of its financial support in the years following the Civil War from the American Missionary Association (whose black and white leaders represented the Congregational and Presbyterian churches), other church groups, and former officers and soldiers of the Union Army. One of the many Civil War veterans who gave substantial sums to the school was General William Jackson Palmer, a Union cavalry commander from Philadelphia. He later built the Denver and Rio Grande Western Railroad, and founded Colorado Springs, Colorado. As the Civil War began in 1861, although his Quaker upbringing made Palmer abhor violence, his passion to see the slaves freed compelled him to enter the war. He was awarded the Medal of Honor for bravery in 1894. (The current Palmer Hall on the campus is named in his honor.)

 Unlike the wealthy Palmer, Sam Armstrong was the son of a missionary to the Sandwich Islands (which later became the U.S. state of Hawaii). He also had dreams for the betterment of the freedmen. He patterned his new school after the model of his father, who had overseen the teaching of reading, writing and arithmetic to the Polynesians. He wanted to teach the skills necessary for blacks to be self-supporting in the impoverished South. Under his guidance, a Hampton-style education became well known as an education that combined cultural uplift with moral and manual training. Armstrong said it was an education that encompassed "the head, the heart, and the hands."

At the close of its first decade, the school reported a total admission in those ten years of 927 students, with 277 graduates, all but 17 of whom had become teachers. Many of them had bought land and established themselves in homes; many were farming as well as teaching; some had gone into business. Only a very small proportion failed to do well. By another 10 years, there had been over 600 graduates. In 1888, of the 537 still alive, three-fourths were teaching, and about half as many undergraduates were also teaching. It was estimated that 15,000 children in community schools were being taught by Hampton's students and alumni that year.

After Armstrong's death, Hampton's leaders continued to develop a highly successful external relations program that forged a network of devoted supporters. By 1900, Hampton was the wealthiest school serving African Americans, largely due to its success in development and fundraising.

Hampton also had the only library school in the United States for educating black librarians. The Hampton Institute Library School opened in 1925 and through its Negro Teacher-Librarian Program (NTLTP) trained and issued professional degrees to 183 black librarians. The library school closed in 1939.

Booker T. Washington: spreading the educational work
Among Hampton's earliest students was Booker T. Washington, who arrived from West Virginia in 1872 at the age of 16. He worked his way through Hampton, and then went on to attend Wayland Seminary in Washington, D.C. After graduation, he returned to Hampton and became a teacher. Upon Armstrong’s recommendation to the founder of a small school in Tuskegee, Alabama, established six years before,  in 1881 the 25-year-old Washington went there to strengthen it and develop it to the status of a normal school, one recognized as being able to produce qualified teachers. 

This new institution eventually became Tuskegee University. Embracing much of Armstrong's philosophy, Washington built Tuskegee into a substantial school and became nationally famous as an educator, orator, and fund-raiser as well. He collaborated with the philanthropist Julius Rosenwald in the early 20th century to create a model for rural black schools; Rosenwald established a fund that matched monies raised by communities to build more than 5,000 schools for rural black children, mostly in the South. In 1888 Washington recruited his Hampton classmate Charles W. Greene to Tuskegee to lead the Agriculture Department. Together they enticed George Washington Carver to the Tuskegee Agriculture faculty upon his graduation with a master's degree from Iowa State University in 1896. 

Carver provided such technical strength in agriculture that, in 1900, Washington assigned Greene to establish a demonstration of black business capability and economic independence off-campus in Tuskegee.  This project, entirely black-owned, comprised 4,000 lots of real estate and was formally established and designated Greenwood in 1901, as a demonstration for black-owned business and residential districts in every city in the nation with a significant black population.  After Washington visited Tulsa, Oklahoma, in 1905 and addressed a large gathering there, the Oklahomans followed the Tuskegee model and named Tulsa's black-owned and operated district "Greenwood" in 1906.

Native Americans
In 1878, Hampton established a formal education program for Native Americans to accommodate men who had been held as prisoners of war. In 1875 at the end of the American Indian Wars, the United States Army sent seventy-two warriors from the Cheyenne, Kiowa, Comanche and Caddo Nations, to imprisonment and exile in St. Augustine, Florida. Essentially they were used as hostages to persuade their peoples in the West to keep peace. Lieutenant Richard Henry Pratt supervised them at Fort Marion and began to arrange for their education in the English language and American culture.

St. Augustine was attracting numerous visitors from the North as it became known as a winter resort. Many became interested in the Native Americans held at Fort Marion and volunteered as teachers. They also provided the men with art supplies. Some of the men created what is now known as ledger art in this period. Some of the resulting works (including by David Pendleton Oakerhater) are held by the Smithsonian Institution.

At the end of the warriors' incarceration, Pratt convinced seventeen of the younger men to enroll at Hampton Institute for additional education. He also recruited additional Native American students: a total of seventy Native Americans, young men and women from various tribes, mostly from the Plains rather than the acculturated tribes of Virginia, joined that first class. Because Virginia's First Families sometimes boasted of their Native American heritage through Pocahontas, some supporters hoped that the Native American students would help locals to accept the institute's black students. The black students were also supposed to help "civilize" the Native American students to current American society, and the Native Americans to "uplift the Negro[es]."

In 1923, in the face of growing controversy over racial mingling, after the former Confederate states had disenfranchised blacks and imposed Jim Crow, the Native American program ended. Native Americans stopped sending their boys to the school after some employers fired Native American men because they had been educated with blacks. The program's final director resigned because she could not prevent "amalgamation" between the Native American girls and black boys.

Name changes, expansion, and community

Hampton Normal and Agricultural Institute became simply Hampton Institute in 1930. In 1931 the George P. Phenix School for all age groups was opened there under principal Ian Ross. A new nurses' training school was attached to the Dixie Hospital, with Nina Gage as director. In 1945 the Austrian-American psychologist, art educator, and author of the influential text book Creative and Mental Growth Viktor Lowenfeld joined the Hampton faculty as an assistant professor of industrial arts and eventually became chair of the Art Department. By 1971 the university offered 42 evening classes in programs including "Educational Psychology", "Introduction to Oral Communication", "Modern Mathematics", and "Playwriting", among others. At the time, the tuition cost for these courses was $30 per semester hour. 

With the addition of departments and graduate programs, it became Hampton University in 1984. Originally located in Elizabeth City County, it was long-located in the Town of Phoebus, incorporated in 1900. Phoebus and Elizabeth City County were consolidated with the neighboring City of Hampton to form a much larger independent city in 1952. The City of Hampton uses the Emancipation Oak on its official seal. From 1960 to 1970, noted diplomat and educator Jerome H. Holland was president of the Hampton Institute.

The university and its leadership has also been met with criticism. In 2018, Hampton University students launched a protest calling for the administration to address several concerns they believed to be longstanding and urgent, including food quality, living conditions and the handling of sexual assault complaints. The university released a statement indicating that it was "moving forward" to address student concerns and issues.

In July 2020, philanthropist MacKenzie Scott donated $30 million to Hampton.  The donation is the largest single gift in Hampton's history. Hampton's president has sole discretion on how funds will be used but has committed to consulting with other university leaders on the best way to allocate the generous donation.

In June 2022, Dr. William R. Harvey retired as the 12th president of Hampton University after 43 years of service.  He is the longest serving president in Hampton's history and one of the longest serving college presidents in the nation. He is succeeded by Darrell K. Williams who is a 1983 graduate of Hampton University.

Presidents

Campus

The campus contains several buildings that contribute to its National Historic Landmark district: Virginia-Cleveland Hall (freshman female dormitory, as well as former home to the school's two cafeterias), Wigwam building (home to administrative offices), Academy Building (administrative offices), Memorial Chapel (religious services) and the President's Mansion House.

The original High School on the campus became Phenix Hall when Hampton City Public Schools opened a new Phenix High School in 1962. Phenix Hall was damaged in a minor fire on June 12, 2008.

The Hampton University Museum was founded in 1868 and is the nation's oldest African-American museum. The museum contains over 9,000 pieces, some of which are highly acclaimed.

Hampton University is home to 16 research centers.  The Hampton University Proton Therapy Institute is the largest free-standing facility of its kind in the world.

The four libraries on campus are the William R. and Norma B. Harvey Library (main library), William H. Moses Jr. Architecture Library, the Music Library, and the Nursing Library.

The Emancipation Oak was cited by the National Geographic Society as one of the 10 great trees in the world.

The waterfront campus is settled near the mouth of the Chesapeake Bay.

National Historic Landmark District
A  portion of the campus along the Hampton River, including many of the older buildings, is a U.S. National Historic Landmark District. Buildings included are:

 Mansion House, original plantation residence of Little Scotland
 Virginia Hall built in 1873
 Academic Hall
 Wigwam
 Marquand Memorial Chapel, a Romanesque Revival red brick chapel with a  tower

In addition, Cleveland Hall, Ogden, and the Administration building are also included in the district.

The district was listed on the National Register of Historic Places in 1969, and declared a National Historic Landmark in 1974.

Student demographics
In 2015, nearly two-thirds of the student body was female and the other third male. Approximately 90% of the population identified as Black and about 30% were Virginia residents.

Academics
Hampton University has 10 accredited schools and colleges.

 School of Engineering and Technology
 School of Pharmacy
 James T. George School of Business
 Scripps Howard School of Journalism and Communication
 School of Nursing
 School of Liberal Arts and Education
 School of Science
 University College
 College of Virginia Beach
 Graduate College

, Hampton offers 50 baccalaureate programs, 26 master's programs, 7 doctoral programs, 2 professional programs, and 10 associate/certificate programs.

The Freddye T. Davy Honors College is a non-degree granting college that offers special learning opportunities and privileges to the most high-achieving undergraduates. To join the honors college, students must formally accept an invitation given by the college or directly apply for admissions into the college.

Hampton University consistently ranks among the top ten HBCUs in the nation and is ranked in Tier 1 (#217) among "National Universities" by U.S. News & World Report.

Hampton's student to faculty ratio is 10 to 1, which is better than the national university average of 18 to 1. 

Hampton is the first and only HBCU to have 100% control of a NASA Mission.

The Alumni Factor named Hampton one of the seven best colleges in Virginia.

Hampton University is classified as a selective admissions institution.

Student activities
There are over 55 student-run organizations on campus.

Greek Life and organizations

Athletics

Hampton's colors are reflex blue and white, and their sports_nickname is "The Pirates". Hampton sports teams participate in NCAA Division I (FCS for football) in the Big South Conference.  They joined this in 2018 upon leaving the Mid-Eastern Athletic Conference. Before joining the Big South, Hampton won MEAC titles in many sports, including football, men's and women's basketball, men's and women's track, and men's and women's tennis. Hampton is one of two NCAA Division 1 HBCU institutions (along with Tennessee State University, in the Ohio Valley Conference) to not be a member of the Mid-Eastern Athletic Conference or Southwestern Athletic Conference.

In 2016, Hampton became the first and only HBCU to field a Division I men's lacrosse team. ESPN held a broadcast on campus preceding the inaugural game in Armstrong Stadium.

Hampton is the only HBCU with a competitive sailing team.

In 2001, the Hampton basketball team won its first NCAA tournament game, when they beat Iowa State 58–57, in one of the largest upsets of all time. They were only the fourth fifteen-seed to upset a two-seed in the tournament's history. They returned to the tournament a year later, as well as in 2006, 2011, 2015 and 2016, having won their conference basketball tournament. Their NCAA tournament record is 2–6, including the play-in game.

The "Lady Pirates" basketball team has seen great success as well, and made trips to the NCAA tournament in 2000, 2003, 2004, 2010–2014, and 2017. In 1988, as a Division II school, the Lady Pirates won the NCAA Women's Division II Basketball Championship, defeating West Texas State. In 2011, as a number-13 seed, the Lady Pirates nearly upset Kentucky, but fell in overtime, 66–62. In 2015, the Lady Pirates played in the Women's NIT, where they defeated Drexel 45–42 in the opening round. However, in the second round, the team lost to West Virginia 57–39.

The Pirates won their conference title in football in 1997, shared the title 1998 and 2004, and won it again outright in 2005 and 2006. From 2004 to 2006, the team won three MEAC Championships and three SBN-Black College National Championships, and was ranked in the Division I FCS top 25 poll each year. The Pirates also sent five players to the NFL Combine in 2007, the most out of any FCS subdivision school for that year. They have also been dominant in tennis, winning the MEAC from 1996 to 1999, 2001–2003 and 2007 for the men, and 1998 and 2002–2004 for the women.

Major rivals include Norfolk State University, located across Hampton Roads in downtown Norfolk, and Howard University in Washington, D.C.

In 2019, Hampton revived their rivalry with Virginia Union University from Richmond, Virginia.

"The Marching Force" marching band
Pirate athletics are supported by a plethora of groups, including "The Marching Force" Marching Band. The marching band has appeared at several notable events, including a Barack Obama Presidential Inauguration parade in Washington, DC. "The Force" was chosen out of a large pool of applicants to participate in the parade as the representative for the state of Virginia.  "The Force" is complemented by the "Ebony Fire" all-women danceline, as well as "Silky", the flag team, and as of 2018, "Shimmering Sapphire Elegance" the majorette team.

Notable alumni

Business

Education

Entertainment, media, and the arts

Politics and government

Science, health care, technology, engineering and mathematics

Sociology and humanities

Sports

See also

 Civil rights movement (1865–1896)
 Dois I. Rosser Jr.
 Emancipation Oak, an historic tree on the campus
 WHOV 88.1 FM

References

Further reading

 Anderson, James D. The Education of Blacks in the South, 1860–1935 (1988) pp 33–78 online.
 Armstrong, Mary F. and Ludlow, Helen W., Hampton and Its Students. New York: G.P. Putnam's Sons, 1874.
 Engs, Robert Francis (1999). Educating the Disfranchised and Disinherited: Samuel Chapman Armstrong and Hampton Institute, 1839–1893. University of Tennessee Press.
 
 
 Schall, Keith L., ed. (1977). Stony the Road: Chapters in the History of Hampton Institute. The University Press of Virginia.

External links

 Official website
 Official athletics website
 Official student newspaper – The Hampton Script
 

 
Historic districts on the National Register of Historic Places in Virginia
University and college buildings on the National Register of Historic Places in Virginia
Private universities and colleges in Virginia
Hampton University
Educational institutions established in 1868
Education in Hampton, Virginia
National Historic Landmarks in Virginia
Universities and colleges accredited by the Southern Association of Colleges and Schools
Buildings and structures in Hampton, Virginia
African-American history of Virginia
National Register of Historic Places in Hampton, Virginia
American Missionary Association
Tourist attractions in Hampton, Virginia
1868 establishments in Virginia